The Piper (lit. The Guest) is a 2015 South Korean period horror-thriller film inspired by the Pied Piper of Hamelin legend. It is written and directed by Kim Gwang-tae, in his directorial debut.

Plot
In the 1950s after the Korean War, a gentle wandering piper with a limp, Woo-ryong, and his sick young son, Young-nam, are en-route by foot to Seoul through the central Korean highlands when they reach a remote village.  The village chief allows Woo-ryong and his son to stay at his house. The piper shows the Chief an English-written note that he says is the name of an American doctor at a hospital in Seoul who can treat Young-nam. The Chief, who tells the piper not to tell anyone else the war is over, agrees but he cannot read English either. Woo-ryong is smitten by a villager called Mi-sook who lost her husband and child in the war.

Woo-ryong quickly sees that the village is plagued by rats that do not fear humans and do not fall for traps and poisons. The chief explains he and his people came here when they heard Chinese soldiers were approaching their old village. They hid the village lepers in a cave with the village shaman. But when the Chinese had not reached the village, they returned to the cave but found all the lepers were dead and being eaten by rats. The vicious vermin then invaded the village because it had no shaman to keep them out.

Woo-ryong volunteers to get rid of the rats in exchange for the price of a pig that will help pay for his son's medical treatment. He spreads a special powder across the village and goes to a nearby hilltop. Checking the wind direction he lights a very smokey fire that smothers the village in smoke. At the same time, Mi-sook, who has been forced by the chief to become the new village shaman begins a purification ritual with bells. Rats start pouring out of the buildings following Woo-ryung's powder to a cave.

Mi-sook starts to fall in love with Woo-ryung due to his kind nature. The son even starts to call her "mummy". However, the chief threatens her if she plans to leave the village after learning that Woo-ryung invited Mi-sook to go to Seoul with him and his son to start a family together. It is turned out that the chief intends to keep the villagers ignorant about the end of the Korean War to maintain his control over the people since if the people found out that the war is over, they would leave the village for the better life in the city or going back to the old village. He also plots with his son, Nam-soo, to not reward the Piper for getting rid of the rats out of petty greed and Nam-soo is also jealous with Woo-ryong for grating Mi-sook's affection. Taking advantage on the ignorance of the villagers, first they create doubt in the mind of the male villagers making them believe that Woo-ryong is a communist spy who brought the rats with him. At a village meeting, the chief says he is going to pay the piper but a dead cat is found. Proof the chief says that the rats are back. He holds up Woo-ryung's English note and says its spying material; it simply reads "Kiss my ass, monkey" - no American doctor's name just a cruel joke.
Woo-ryung reaches for the money but Nam-soo chops off two of his fingers with a knife. The villagers turn on Woo-ryung and Young-nam, even Mi-sook condemns them. But as the villagers get ready to throw them out, Mi-sook returns in a shamanic trance but stabbed in the stomach. She tells the villagers that on a day without sun they will all die and their children might live or die, repeating the original shaman's prophecy before she was locked up and burnt alive by the villagers. Mi-sook then dies from her wounds.

Before they leave, the Chief puts two poisoned rice-balls in Woo-ryung's knapsack to kill them to prevent the father and son from telling anyone about the location of the village. The injured piper falls asleep while his son sneaks back to the village to retrieve his father's pipe from the Chief's house. On the way back, Young-nam ate one of the poisoned rice-balls and dies.

Woo-ryong sets out on a revenge. After burning his son's body on a funeral pyre, he covers himself in the special powder he used earlier to attract the rats and reopens the cave. He uses his two severed fingers as bait and starts playing his pipe to lead the rats back to the village where they devour all the adults including the chief and his son. Next morning only the villagers' children are alive, Woo-ryung plays his pipe and leads them to the cave where he trapped the rats. After sealing them all in, he turns and looks hard into the camera.

Cast

Ryu Seung-ryong as Woo-ryong
Lee Sung-min as Village chief
Chun Woo-hee as Mi-sook
Lee Joon as Nam-soo
Goo Seung-hyun as Young-nam
Jung Kyung-ho as Chul-soo's father
Kim Jung-young as Chul-soo's mother 
Park Yoon-seok as Pil-geun 
Yoon Dae-yeol as Bong-woo 
Lee Dong-hee as Dae-hee 
Lee Seung-joon  as Seung-pal 
Kim Jin-wook as Jin-seong 
Do Gi-beom as Bong-pil 
Lee Won-seop as Seung-won 
Lee Sang-ok as Mi-ok 
Shin Mi-yeong as Yeon-mi 
Kim Seon-kyeong as Seon-ja 
Son San as Myeong-san 
Lee Min-ji as Min-young
Jung Joon-won as Chul-soo
Ham Sung-min as Dong-choon
Song Ye-dam as Young-ho 
Song Ye-joon as Young-seong 
Baek Seung-ho as Dam-soo 
Lee Seo-yeon as Myeong-ran 
Park Si-yeon  as Ah-ran 
Park Woong-bi as Mi-ja 
Kim Young-sun as Mudang
Han Seong-yong as Deok-soo the leper
Jeon Gook-hwan as Elder

Production
The film was shot on location in the Korean highlands of Gangwon Province.

Reception
The Piper received mostly positive reviews from critics, who praised the film's atmosphere, 
Maggie Lee from Variety praised the film's performances, cinematography, and historical/political themes. Lee concluded her review by writing, "As a bleak fable on human nature, it’s pretty old hat, but as an allegory on Korean history and politics, the movie proves cynically observant, with starkly economical storytelling and sharp visual effects to boot." Luke Ryan Baldock from Hollywood News, rating the film four out of five stars, offered the film similar praise, writing, " It’s depressing to be sure, but very rewarding for lovers of dark cinema".
Time Out awarded the film four out of five stars, writing, "Frequently arresting and blowing a breath of originality into this year’s stale crop of commercial Korean fare, Kim’s film only falters with a needlessly lengthy setup and a few inchoate sideplots. Those minor grievances aside, The Piper remains a wickedly fun gust of chills that is just the ticket to beat the heat this season." Pierce Conran of Screen Anarchy called the film "engrossing and entertaining", praising the film's characterizations, imagery, emotional resonance, and finale.

Awards and nominations

Home media
The film was released in the United States by CJ Entertainment on February 2, 2016.

References

External links
 
  
 
 
 
 

2015 films
2015 horror films
2010s mystery thriller films
2015 horror thriller films
2010s historical horror films
Films based on Pied Piper of Hamelin
Films set in the 1950s
2010s Korean-language films
South Korean fantasy films
South Korean horror thriller films
South Korean mystery thriller films
2015 directorial debut films
2010s South Korean films